Estigmene rothi is a moth of the  family Erebidae. It was described by Rothschild in 1910. It is found in Nigeria.

References

 Natural History Museum Lepidoptera generic names catalog

Endemic fauna of Nigeria
Spilosomina
Moths described in 1910